, whose Phantom Thief code name is , is a fictional character in the Persona series, first appearing in Persona 5 as one of its main characters. She's the student council president of Shujin Academy who lives a double life as a Phantom Thief.

Concept and creation

Makoto Niijima first appears in Persona 5, and her design was created by Shigenori Soejima. Persona 5 director Katsura Hashino described her as someone who "no longer [has] a place where they belong in society" and as a "juvenile academic," adding that the game's events gave her a sense of belonging. He discussed how her role as a Phantom Thief reflects how she breaks away from societal expectations. Her Personas, Johanna and Anat, are based on Pope Joan and the Semitic goddess of the same name. She is voiced by Rina Satō in the original Japanese audio, and Cherami Leigh in the English localization. Leigh regards Makoto's story as her dealing with moral and ethical grey areas, specifically in how she feels about the protagonists. She describes her character as "unconventional."

Appearances
Her role in Persona 5 begins with her being tasked to uncover clues about the Phantom Thieves, a group of people going into a place called the Metaverse and changing the hearts of ne'er do wells, after being pushed into it with the threat of not getting a recommendation for university. She eventually starts following Joker, Ryuji Sakamoto, Ann Takamaki, and Yusuke Kitagawa, eventually discovering their true identities as the Phantom Thieves due to Ann and Ryuji's failure to discuss their activities subtly. She keeps their identity secret, on the condition that they are able to change the heart of an unidentified mafia boss. She secretly holds the Phantom Thieves in high regard, much to the chagrin of her sister Sae Niijima, who is a prosecutor investigating the Phantom Thieves. After being called a burden by her sister and the Phantom Thieves, she aims to use herself as bait to discover the identity of the mafia boss, which ends up getting her and the others blackmailed for 3 million yen, with the risk of Makoto being forced into prostitution if they cannot pay up. Forgiving her for her mistake and realizing she has become one of the mafia boss' "customers", the Phantom Thieves allow her to come with them to the Metaverse to the mafia boss' Palace, a manifestation of a person's heart, where she becomes so angered and disgusted by his misogyny and callous greed that she awakens to her Persona, Johanna, and joins the Phantom Thieves. After they defeat him and change his heart, she gets a call saying that the blackmail is over. She reports to the principal that she found no evidence that the Phantom Thieves are students, and expresses disinterest in a recommendation letter.

She comes to bond with the Phantom Thieves, including Ann, who previously disliked her and wrongfully accused her of overlooking an abusive teacher. She aides the Phantom Thieves with her tactical skill and by planting spyware in her sister's laptop to get investigation information. She suggests reaching out to a detective named Goro Akechi to get information, but discovers that he knows the identities of the Phantom Thieves and blackmails them into stealing her sister's heart. Makoto reveals that she knew of her sister having a palace, but wanted to change her heart through other means. Upon exploring her palace, Makoto discovers that her sister thinks of trials as games to be won by any means, and has a breakdown while fighting her sister's shadow. After defeating her, Makoto is able to convince Sae to change her ways. Makoto and the others later discover the true nature of the Metaverse and Akechi's true identity as the Black Mask, and after some tribulations are able to defeat its master.

She appears in Phantasy Star Online 2 as a costume, and in Super Smash Bros. Ultimate as a background character on the stage Mementos, which comes with Joker's DLC Pack.

Merchandise
Makoto received a Figma figurine and a Nendoroid figurine, both which were announced at the CCG Expo 2018. A prototype of the Figma figurine was later shown. A prototype Amakuni figurine was revealed at Wonder Festival 2017 of Makoto riding her Persona, Johanna.

Reception
Makoto has received generally positive reception, identified as a fan favorite. She was the second most popular Persona 5 character by fans after the lead protagonist. Her anime adaptation was well-received by fans as well. Kimberley Wallace of Game Informer regarded her as her favorite Persona 5 character and one of her favorites in the series. She cited her work ethic and strong convictions as part of why she enjoys her so much. Holly Green for Paste Magazine found her to be one of the best new video game characters of 2017, citing her "stylish" character design. RPGFan called her their favorite supporting character of 2017, praising how she balances her Phantom Thief role - a "motorcycle-riding badass" - and her role as a "fastidious student council president." RPGFan's readership felt similarly, where she was "far and away" the favorite. Clayton Purdom for The A.V. Club ranked her his second favorite character in Persona 5, identifying her "inner rage boil[ing] over" as the game's best moment and the most "interesting character moment." Steve Jones for Anime News Network felt similarly about this scene; he noted that the scene - depicting someone "who's expected to be the model student and nothing more" - was a typical one, but that it was also executed well.

She has been considered as the best female character in Persona 5 by writers from various websites, including Siliconera, Gamasutra, Destructoid, RPGamer, and GameSpot.  Jenni for Siliconera discussed how she has sides to her that she doesn't show, regarding her as a "practical character." Amanda Yeo for Kotaku discussed how despite initially disliking Makoto due to her cold demeanor and how she works against the protagonists at first, she warmed up to her due to Makoto recognizing her flaws and working towards improving. She regards her as a stark contrast to fellow protagonist Ryuji Sakamoto, due to his brash and hot personality and felt that his fans would dislike her, and vice versa.

References

Anat
Female characters in video games
Fictional aikidoka
Fictional characters with evocation or summoning abilities
Fictional gentleman thieves
Fictional high school students
Fictional Japanese people in video games
Fictional fist-load fighters
Orphan characters in video games
Persona 5 characters
Sega protagonists
Teenage characters in video games
Video game characters introduced in 2016
Video game characters who have mental powers
Vigilante characters in video games